Marko Tomasović (born 18 May 1976) is a Croatian composer and songwriter. He was born in Zagreb, Croatia, where he has been living all of his life. So far he composed more than 300 songs for some of the best Croatian singers, such as Zdenka Kovačiček, Tereza Kesovija, Oliver Dragojević, Emilija Kokić, Jasna Zlokić, Tomislav Bralić, Danijela Martinović, Alen Vitasović, Emina Arapović, Ibrica Jusić, Lidija Bačić, Maja Šuput, Alen Nižetić, Marina Tomašević...
He discovered many young talents and wrote three Band-aid songs.
His work has covered various genres.

Marko is full member of Croatian Composers' Society, and according to them he was listed as one of the 10 most performed authors in Croatia in 2004 (The list was published in alphabetical order).

Musical career and personal life

Early life and career
He grew up listening to his idols Roxette, Bryan Adams, Bon Jovi, Scorpions and Cher. Critics say that even today you can hear their influence in Marko's songs, while he cherishes power pop-rock style.

In 1994 Ladislav Račić first gave him a chance to teach music on Rock Academia in Zagreb. Two years later he had additional training with Professor Vanja Lisak.

Lisak recommended Marko to his colleague Zdenka Kovačiček and shortly after that they initiate collaboration.

He worked on three Zdenka's CDs, on about 40 songs. Together they won Zagrebfest in 2000 and his favourite award to Zdenka's interpretation on Zadarfest 2001 for song "Možda ni ne osjećam kraj" (Maybe I don't fell it is end).
Audience best attached with song "Žena za sva vremena" (I'm a woman) and it became hymn of all women.

Marko points out song "To nisam bila ja" (That was not me) which reminds him the most of his musical idols.
For vocal performance for the album "Ja živim svoj san" (I am living my dream) on which all music (12 songs) is written by Marko, with production and arrangements of Duško Mandić, Zdenka wins the highest Croatian award - PORIN for the best singer in Croatia in 2001.

Another key figure in Marko's career was an entertainment manager Boris Šuput. He discovered a talent for writing commercial songs ("pop songs") in Marko. 6 years old collaboration resulted with hits "Uzmi me", "Hello", "Baby", "Ljubila sam kao mala", "Jedna noć" and others, all performed by Šuput's daughter Maja and group called Enjoy. Šuput sent young and anonymous Marko to many singers from Croatian and Slovenian music scene.

First major opportunity was given by Marina Tomašević with the song "Ja sam tvoja žena" on Croatia in the Eurovision Song Contest (Dora) in 1999. Later, whole Marina's album was named after that successful song.

With the help of Vladimir Mihaljek - Miha, on Croatian Radio Festival in 2001, he was present with 13 different songs. That experience earned him a nomination for Guinness.

Notable collaborations 

 Jasna Zlokić – composer and executive producer on 3 of her albums; including songs "Zime, ljeta, jeseni" (Winters, summers, autumns), "Putevima vjetra" (Wind's way), "Soba 210" (Room 210) and others.
 Ibrica Jusić – songs for Croatia in the Eurovision Song Contest
 Ivana Radovniković – Dora 2007, songs "Samo probaj" (Dare to love me), which is loved by teenagers, and "Cafe".

 Claudia Beni - he discovered the talent
 Emilija Kokić – they started to work together in 2002. Since then, they wrote many broadcast songs, not just for Emilija, but also for other performers. After Emilija's show on 50th anniversary of Eurosong contest in Copenhagen, Marko's and Emilija's songs appeared on top-lists all over the world: in Netherlands, Sweden, German, Denmark, Italia, England, Scotland, Greece... Emilija's single "I'll never fall in love again" was number 1 on Aruba's Top 20 in November 2006 for three weeks, ahead of Shakira and Marc Anthony. Later, that news was announced on all major web portals with worldwide music charts.
 Angels - they had success as debut performance on Dora with song "Party djevojka" (Party girl), group members were only 16
 Emina Arapović – in 2007 they started working together with song "Vučica" (She-wolf); song gained success and got Emina a contract with Austrian label "Room 66"; They released album "Cura od akcije" (Girl of Action) on which Marko composed 8 songs
 Lidija Bačić – at the end of 2008 Marko started working with Lidija, who he met in 2001 on Dora; after she was the runner-up for Croatian Idol, Lidija became a triple winner on Zagrebfest in 2008; together they received more than 17 awards at several festivals in Croatia and abroad

Band-aid
While he was serving civil service in Home for children in Zagreb (known as "Nazorova"), he dedicated to do humanitarian activities. He wrote songs "Još ima dobrih ljudi" (There are still good people) and "Samo se srcem dobro vidi" (Only with heart you see good) on which participated all Croatian singers: ENI, Vanna, Tony Cetinski, Vesna Pisarović, Aki Rahimovski ("Parni Valjak"), Mladen Bodalec ("Prljavo Kazalište"), Massimo, Gabi Novak, Tereza Kesovija, Kićo Slabinac, Jacques Houdek, Ivana Kindl, Tina i Nikša, Ivana Brkić, Ivana Banfić, Vladimir Kočiš-Zec, etc...

Recent work

For his achievements he always referrers to contribution of his arrangers and lyricists. He also mentions and big part of other associates: sound technicians, back up vocals and other musicians.
He works the most with Duško Mandić, Aleksandar Valenčić, Željko Pavičić and Robert Pilepić. Especially is proud that most of his "guitar work" has been done by Croatian rock musicians Vedran Božić and Damir Lipošek-Kex.

Select awards

To Marko

 2000 Grand Prix Zagrebfest
 2006 Grand Prix Zagrebfest
 2009 Grand Prix Zagrebfest

To Marko's songs

 1999 Zadarfest 1st Debut Award (Sanella "Da li stvarno je kraj")
 2000 Zadarfest 1st Debut Award (Josip Katalenić "Naivan i mlad")
 2000 Zagrebfest 1st Audience Award ( Zdenka Kovačiček "Vrati se u moje dane")
 2001 Zadarfest Best Interpretation Award (Zdenka Kovačiček "Možda ni ne osjećam kraj")
 2002 Banja Luka 1st Audience Award (Emilija Kokić i Boris Režak "Jesmo li jedno drugom suđeni")
 2002 Knin 1st Prize of Jury ( Zdenka Kovačiček "Još nosim tvoje dodire")

 2002 Spring hit song, Zadar 1st Prize of Radio Stations (Zdenka Kovačiček "Odavno shvatila sam sve" )
 2002 Summer hit song, Čakovec 1st Award (Emilija Kokić "Santa ledena")
 2002 Banja Luka, 2nd Prize of Jury ( Maja Tatić "Još te osjećam")
 2002 Splitski festival 1st Stage Performance Award (Teens "Generacija")
 2002 Porin for the best Croatian singer of the year 2001 for Zdenka Kovačiček
 2003 Knin 1st Prize of Jury (Emilija Kokić "Oprosti ako smetam")
 2004 Zl.ž.Slavonije,Požega 3rd Award( Emilija Kokić "Halo")
 2005 Melodije Istre i Kvarnera Best Interpretation Award (Sabrina Hebiri "Dragi Bog zna")
 2006 Zl.ž.Slavonije,Požega 3rd Award(Jasna Zlokić "Tamo gdje dišeš")
 2006 Zagrebfest 1st Prize of Jury (Marko Tomasović "Svako jutro još po tebi miriše")
 2007 Pjesmom do srca 3rd Prize of Radio Stations (Juraj Galina "Pjesma narodna")
 2008 ZadarTeenfest 1st Award (Tatjana Banđen "Bit ću sa tobom")
 2008 Croatian Radio Festival (HRF) 1st Prize of Radio Stations -(Danijela Martinović " 'Ko će tebe mi zaminit")
 2008 Zagrebfest 1st Prize of Jury (Lidija Bačić "Kiša")
 2009 Melod. Istre i Kvar. Best Interpretation Award (Lidija Bačić (i kl. Grobnik)" Ne moren kontra sebe")
 2009 Sunčane skale 2nd Prize of Jury (Lidija Bačić "Kiša")
 2010 Darfest Best Interpretation Award (Jelena Stipković "Ti si varao mene")
 2010 Zadarfest 1st Prize of Jury (Lidija Bačić "Ako te ikad izgubim")
 2011 Melodije Mostara Best Interpretation Award (Vedrana Vukojević "Svoja")
 2011 Mel. Istre i Kvar- Award Croatian Radio Rijeka for 100 weeks on top-list (Lidija Bačić i kl. Grobnik "Ne moren kontra sebe")
 2013. MEF 1st Prize for the best Composition (Mirko Švenda-Žiga "Prosjak")
 2014. Zlatne Note Best Interpretation Award (Anamarija Filipović "Izdala me moja prijateljica")
 2014. Zlatne Note Best Interpretation Award (Marko Tomasović "Uvijek ću biti tvoj")

References

External links
 YouTube - hear all Marko's songs

1976 births
Living people
Croatian songwriters
Croatian composers